Absolutely is the debut solo album by the Canadian rock guitarist Rik Emmett, released in 1990, after leaving the heavy metal band Triumph. The album was released in 1990 and went gold in Canada. The third cut on the album, "Saved by Love", was used for the closing credits of the movie Problem Child 2.  The album includes ten songs and one instrumental track.

Track listing
All songs written by (Rik Emmett) unless otherwise noted:

 "Drive Time" – 4:21
 "Big Lie" – 4:26
 "Saved by Love" – 4:04
 "When a Heart Breaks" – 3:43
 "World of Wonder" – 3:58
 "Stand and Deliver" – 5:28
 "The Way That You Love Me" (Rik Emmett / Bob Halligan, Jr.) – 4:21
 "Middle Ground" – 3:58
 "Heaven Only Knows – 4:04
 "Smart, Fast, Mean and Lucky" (Rik Emmett / Graham Shaw) – 3:58
 "Passage (For Big Nick)" – 2:32

Personnel
 Rik Emmett – guitars, synthesizers, lead vocals, background vocals on tracks 1–3, 6, & 8
 David Tkaczuk – keyboards, piano, arranging, synthesizers
 Colleen Allen – sax (soprano), background vocals on Tracks 2 & 6 
 Chris Brockway – bass, background vocals on Tracks 1 – 3, 6 & 8
 Randy Cooke – drums
 Jeff Stevens – additional percussion, shaker, tambourine
 Colina Phillips, Joel Wade & Vivienne Williams – background vocals on Tracks 3, 5 and 9
 Paula Shear – background vocals on Tracks 1, 3, & 8

Production
 Rik Emmett – producer
 Ross Munro – executive producer
 Earl Torno – engineer & mixing
 Rick Pacholko – assistant engineer
 George Graves – mastering
 Chris Chapman – photography

Singles 
"Big Lie" – Charisma PRCD 023; released April 11, 1990 (USA)
"Big Lie" – Duke Street Records DSRD-9047; released April 11, 1990 (Canada)
"When a Heart Breaks/Open-ended Interview Rik Emmett" – Duke DSRDS-9063; released April 15, 1990 (Canada)
"Saved By Love" – Duke DSRDS-9086; released April 18, 1990 (Canada)

Charts

Album

Singles

Notes

External links
 Absolutely entry at the Official Rik Emmett Homepage

Rik Emmett albums
1990 debut albums
MCA Records albums